Judo is one of the sports at the quadrennial Jeux de la Francophonie (Francophone Games) competition. It has been one of the sports held at the event since the inaugural edition in 1989.

Editions

References

External links
 Past medallists from the official website 

 
Jeux de la Francophonie
Judo